Robert Trevelyan may refer to:

 R. C. Trevelyan (1872–1951), English poet and translator
 Robert Trevelyan (cricketer) (born 1970), English cricketer